Manuele Castorani (born 7 October 1999) is an Italian footballer who plays as a midfielder for  club Siena on loan from Ascoli.

Career

Club career
Castorani is a product of Empoli. At the age of 17, Castorani was sent out on loan to Serie D club Ponsacco. He made 28 appearances and scored three goals in his first season. In July 2018, the loan deal was extended for one season more. In his second season at the club, he made 40 appearances. In the summer 2019, he moved to fellow league club SC Ligorna 1922.

After two and a half seasons in Serie D, Castorani joined Serie C club Virtus Francavilla on 2 January 2020.

On 7 July 2021, he signed a three-year contract with Serie B club Ascoli.

On 19 January 2022, he joined Feralpisalò on loan. On 1 September 2022, Castorani was loaned to Siena.

References

External links
 

Living people
1999 births
Italian footballers
Association football midfielders
Serie B players
Serie C players
Serie D players
Empoli F.C. players
Virtus Francavilla Calcio players
Ascoli Calcio 1898 F.C. players
FeralpiSalò players
A.C.N. Siena 1904 players